Rohn may refer to:

People

Given name
 Rohn Thomas, American actor
 Rohn Stark (b. 1959), American football player

Surname
 Dan Rohn (b. 1957), baseball player
 Emileigh Rohn, American musician
 Jennifer Rohn (b. 1967), scientist and novelist
 Jim Rohn (1930-2009), American entrepreneur
 Karl Rohn (1855-1920), German mathematician
 Thorleiv Røhn (1881-1963), Norwegian military officer and gymnast

Other
 Rohn Industries, Inc., manufacturer of telecommunications infrastructure
 Rhön Mountains in Germany

See also
 Rhon (disambiguation) 
 Rhone (disambiguation) 
 Rhône, a major river in France